Juan Sebastián Sforza (born 14 February 2002) is an Argentine professional footballer who plays as a midfielder for Newell's Old Boys.

Club career
Sforza began his career at the age of eight with Santa Teresita, before moving over to Unión de Álvarez and then Sarmiento. He soon penned terms with Fundación Messi, an academy set up by Lionel Messi; Lionel's brother, Matías, became one of Sforza's agents in 2019. In 2015, Sforza joined Newell's Old Boys. He progressed through their academy for the next five years, notably captaining their reserves. Sforza signed his first professional contract on 13 March 2019. His breakthrough into the first-team wouldn't arrive for another twelve months, though would do so in late-2020 under manager Frank Darío Kudelka.

Sforza's senior debut arrived on 19 December 2020 in a Copa de la Liga Profesional win away to Godoy Cruz, as the midfielder replaced Julián Fernández with four minutes remaining. He had previously been an unused substitute five times in that competition. His first career goal arrived soon after during a victory over Central Córdoba on 28 December.

International career
Sforza represented Argentina at U15 and U17 level; as captain of both. He was a part of the squad that won the 2017 South American U-15 Championship on home soil, as he netted goals against invitees Czech Republic and, in the semi-finals, Peru. After appearing for the U17s in a friendly with the United States in 2018, the midfielder was selected by Pablo Aimar in 2019 for the South American U-17 Championship in Peru and FIFA U-17 World Cup in Brazil. He scored once, versus Uruguay, in eight appearances at the former as they won the trophy, before featuring four times at latter as they reached the round of sixteen.

Career statistics
.

Honours
Argentina U15
South American U-15 Championship: 2017

Argentina U17
South American U-17 Championship: 2019

Notes

References

External links

2002 births
Living people
Footballers from Rosario, Santa Fe
Argentine people of Italian descent
Argentine footballers
Argentina youth international footballers
Association football midfielders
Argentine Primera División players
Newell's Old Boys footballers